The 1925 Nevada Wolf Pack football team was an American football team that represented the University of Nevada in the Far Western Conference (FWC) during the 1925 college football season. In its first season under head coach Buck Shaw, the team compiled a 4–3–1 record (3–1 against conference opponents), shut out four opponents, and finished second in the inaugural season of play in the Far Western Conference.

Bill Gutteron played quarterback for the Wolf Pack from 1923 to 1925. He later played quarterback in the National Football League (NFL) for the Los Angeles Buccaneers.

Schedule

References

Nevada
Nevada Wolf Pack football seasons
Nevada Wolf Pack football